Fay Bound Alberti (born 1971) is a British cultural historian of gender, emotion and medicine, and Professor of Modern History and UKRI Future Leaders Fellow at King’s College London, where she is PI of Interface and Director of the Centre for Technology and the Body. She was previously Professor of Modern History at the University of York. Bound Alberti is a Fellow of the Royal Historical Society (FRHistS) and previously foundation future leader at the Foundation for Science and Technology.

Early life and education
Fay Bound Alberti was born in Morecambe, Lancashire and raised in Wales. Her brother is the British Cinematographer Lol Crawley. Fay received her B.A. in History and English from the University of Wales in 1995, after which she completed her M.A. and Ph.D. in history at the University of York (1996–2000). She completed post-doctoral research in the history of medicine from 2001 to 2004 at the Wellcome Trust Centre for the History of Medicine at University College London and undertook further studies at the Institute for Philanthropy and the London Business School.

Career
Bound Alberti has taught at several British universities including the Open University, University of Lancaster, the University of Manchester and University College London and was one of the founders of the Centre for the History of Emotions at Queen Mary University. She has been the Head of philanthropy for the Arcadia Foundation, the charitable foundation of Lisbet Rausing and Peter Baldwin, and head of medical humanities grants at the Wellcome Trust. In 2019 she was named by the MP Chris Skidmore as one of the first UK Research and Innovation Future Leaders Fellows, to pursue her research into the cultural history and emotions of face transplants as part of the AboutFace project. She took up this post at the University of York, where she was Professor in History. In 2023, Bound Alberti joined King's College Longon as Professor of Modern History and Director of the Centre for Technology and the Body. The AboutFace project has entered its second phase as Interface, a research project which explores the relationship between identity, emotion, and communication, as revealed through the human face.

Writing and media
Bound Alberti is the author of Matters of the Heart: History, Medicine, and Emotion (2010), a history of cultural narratives of the heart and notions of selfhood, This Mortal Coil: The Human Body in History and Culture (2016), and A Biography of Loneliness: the history of an Emotion. A Biography of Loneliness is being translated into other languages, including simple and complex Chinese. Matters of the Heart was shortlisted for the Longman History Today award for book of the year. This Mortal Coil was shortlisted for the BSHS Dingle Prize.

Until 2019 Bound Alberti was part of the History Girls blogging collective, and has written for The F-Word feminist blog on the intersections between softcore pornography and the modern music video, and for Open Democracy on open access to academic works. She has written several articles on loneliness for Aeon Magazine, The Conversation and The Guardian newspaper.

Bound Alberti was interviewed by Julie Beck for The Atlantic Magazine in 2017 on the cultural and psychological history of human perceptions of the heart. Bound Alberti appeared on BBC Radio 3's Free Thinking to discuss This Mortal Coil in 2016 and on BBC Radio 4's In Our Time to discuss the heart in 2006. She also appeared on the Radio 4 series on the heart with the cleric and broadcaster Giles Fraser. On the topic of loneliness, she was interviewed by Global News for the Charles Adler show, appeared on BBC Radio 4's Thinking Allowed, and took part in the University of York's podcast series, The Story of Things. She also took part in a video interview with Saprina Panday for Women's Health Interactive. Fay is also a TED speaker, having spoken on loneliness at the TED Summit in Edinburgh, 2019.

Selected publications

References

External links

Profile, King's College London 
UK Research and Innovation 
Research Portal, King's College London

Living people
21st-century British historians
Academics of Queen Mary University of London
Academics of the University of Manchester
Academics of University College London
Historians of science
British medical historians
Oxford University Press people
1971 births
Alumni of the University of Wales
Alumni of the University of York
People from Morecambe
Fellows of the Royal Historical Society
UK Research and Innovation Future Leaders Fellowship